Rubane is one of the Bijagós Islands in Guinea-Bissau. The island has a population of 165 (2009 census). The island lies northeast of the larger island of Bubaque, across a narrow strait. It is part of the Boloma Bijagós Biosphere Reserve.

References

External links

Bolama Region
Populated places in Guinea-Bissau
Bissagos Islands